Dijon Hendra Talton is an American producer, actor, singer and director. He won several awards as part of the cast of Glee, and has since continued to play small roles on television and film, as well as producing through his company The Talton Company. In his projects, he typically works with his cousin Meagan Good.

Early and personal life
Dijon Hendra Talton was born on September 17, 1989, in Los Angeles, California, to Len and Gina Talton. He has said that his older cousin Meagan Good is his best friend and was like a second mother growing up.

In 2016, he was part of the Artistic Alliance for Justice campaign video encouraging black people to vote in the 2016 United States presidential election.

His partner Frank Watson, NYC club promoter, died in 2022.

Career
Talton had his first acting role in 1998, playing the kid in L.A. Without a Map, though he had played the young fisherman who catches Tyra Banks in McDonald's commercials in 1996.

In 2009, Talton played Matt Rutherford, a member of the glee club in the first season of Glee. He described his character as a fun person who always wanted to join the glee club but, as a member of the football team, felt this was unacceptable until quarterback Finn Hudson (Cory Monteith) did. He was a dancer on the show but never sang a solo on screen. As part of the main ensemble cast, he received a Screen Actors Guild Award and Peabody Award. He also toured with the cast in 2010. His next appearances on the show were in its final two episodes in 2015.

After Glee, Talton starred as Raven in I Will Follow, directed by Ava DuVernay, with Omari Hardwick, which was released in 2011. He also put out music singles "Wild Out" in 2012, with a music video directed by Meagan Good and starring Logan Browning, and "Shorty She Bad" with Jay Blaze in 2014. The "Shorty She Bad" music video premiered on Vibe before getting airtime on MTV VOD. He was cast in the lead role of Kendall, a gay black man, in the pilot Bros from Lena Waithe in 2014, which was picked up for development by HBO.

He then took supporting roles in films, starring alongside Hardwick and Good in the 2018 Sundance Film Festival-premiered A Boy. A Girl. A Dream.. He played Diggy in the 2018 movie Never Heard and Nate in 2021's Take Out Girl. He was also a producer of Take Out Girl, which was in competition for the Best Narrative Feature award at the 2020 American Black Film Festival. In July 2020, he launched a talk show, Cousins, with Meagan and La'Myia Good.

He started a production company, The Talton Company, as he wanted to see stories of black and brown people that are not stereotypical and that are more diverse. For the company, he is executive producer of the 2022 Allblk show À la carte with Meagan Good, which he also directs. The pilot episode was originally screened in 2019. The show is Talton's directorial debut, and he said that "[he] wanted to direct Á La Carte because it's a good story. It's a story about human beings and how we're all flawed but still nuanced, graceful, and beautiful in the midst of it".

References

External links

1989 births
Living people
American film producers
American television producers
Male actors from Los Angeles